The Worst You Can Do Is Harm is the debut album by indie rock band The Long Winters. It was released by Barsuk Records in 2002. The album's title comes from a line in Track 8, "Scent of Lime."

Track listing
 "Give Me a Moment" – 5:49
 "Carparts" – 4:05
 "Samaritan" – 2:44
 "Mimi" – 5:06
 "Medicine Cabinet Pirate" – 5:04
 "Unsalted Butter" – 4:47
 "Government Loans" – 4:09
 "Scent of Lime" – 4:04
 "Copernicus" – 5:25
 "Shanty Town" – 2:36

References

External links

The Long Winters albums
2002 albums
Barsuk Records albums
Albums produced by Chris Walla